The 2022 Arkansas House of Representatives elections was held on November 8, 2022. Elections were held to elect representatives from all 100 House of Representatives districts across the U.S. state of Arkansas. It was held alongside numerous other federal, state, and local elections, including the 2022 Arkansas Senate election.

Retirements

Democrats
District 29: Fredrick Love retired due to term limits.
District 48: Reginald Murdock retired to run for state senate from District 9.
District 55: Monte Hodges retired to run for U. S. representative from Arkansas's 1st congressional district.
District 89: Megan Godfrey retired.

Republicans
District 15: Ken Bragg retired.
District 39: Mark Lowery retired to run for treasurer of Arkansas.
District 56: Joe Jett retired.
District 58: Brandt Smith retired to run for U. S. representative from Arkansas's 1st congressional district.
District 62: Michelle Gray retired.
District 63: Stu Smith retired.
District 64: John Payton retired to run for state senate from District 22.
District 70: Spencer Hawks retired to run for state senate from District 17.
District 71: Joe Cloud retired.
District 77: Justin Boyd retired to run for state senate from District 27.
District 79: Gary Deffenbaugh retired due to term limits.
District 81: Bruce Coleman retired.
District 83: Keith Slape retired to run for state senate from District 28.
District 88: Clint Penzo retired to run for state senate from District 31.
District 92: Gayla Hendren McKenzie retired to run for state senate from District 35.
District 93: Jim Dotson retired to run for state senate from District 34.
District 96: Joshua P. Bryant retired to run for state senate from District 32.
District 100: Nelda Speaks retired.

Incumbents defeated

Republicans
District 2: Marsh Davis lost renomination to Trey Steimel after being redistricted from District 61.
District 39: Craig Christiansen lost renomination to Wayne Long after being redistricted from District 47.
District 61: David Hillman lost renomination to Jeremiah Moore after being redistricted from District 13.

Predictions

Results

Overall

Closest races 
Seats where the margin of victory was under 10%:
 
    
  
 
  
  
  (gain)

District 1

District 2

District 3

District 4

District 5

District 6

District 7

District 8

District 9

District 10

District 11

District 12

District 13

District 14

District 15

District 16

District 17

District 18

District 19

District 20

District 21

District 22

District 23

District 24

District 25

District 26

District 27

District 28

District 29

District 30

District 31

District 32

District 33

District 34

District 35

District 36

District 37

District 38

District 39

District 40

District 41

District 42

District 43

District 44

District 45

District 46

District 47

District 48

District 49

District 50

District 51

District 52

District 53

District 54

District 55

District 56

District 57

District 58

District 59

District 60

District 61

District 62

District 63

District 64

District 65

District 66

District 67

District 68

District 69

District 70

District 71

District 72

District 73

District 74

District 75

District 76

District 77

District 78

District 79

District 80

District 81

District 82

District 83

District 84

District 85

District 86

District 87

District 88

District 89

District 90

District 91

District 92

District 93

District 94

District 95

District 96

District 97

District 98

District 99

District 100

See also
 2022 Arkansas elections
 2022 Arkansas Senate election

References

External links

Arkansas House of Representatives
House of Representatives
Arkansas House